Electric Brae: A Modern Romance was the first novel by Scottish writer Andrew Greig. The title is a reference to Electric Brae in South Ayrshire, where a natural optical illusion makes it seem that things can roll uphill.

Plot summary

Jimmy Renilson is an engineer aboard a North Sea oil rig, who divides his time between his affair with temperamental artist Kim Russell (born Ruslawska) and rock climbing. The narrative describes Jimmy's stormy relationship with Kim, and events affecting their circle of friends, especially Jimmy's climbing friend Graeme and his bisexual partner Lesley. Set in various parts of Scotland, especially Orkney, the book describes the two men's ambition to climb the Old Man of Hoy.

The main story is framed in a memory game Jimmy is playing with Kim's daughter.

The author has described the book as 'a modern romance without heather or hardmen'. It was shortlisted for the McVitie's Prize for Scottish Writer of the Year.

References

External links
Review

1992 British novels
Novels by Andrew Greig
Scottish novels
Novels set in South Ayrshire
1992 debut novels
Novels set in Orkney
Canongate Books books